Maxon may refer to:

People 
 Bonnie Maxon (born 1981), American professional wrestler
 Bradley Maxon Hamlett (fl. from 2009), American politician
 Carey Maxon (born 1978), American artist
 Densmore Maxon (1820–1887), American farmer and politician 
 Eric Maxon (1882–1963), British actor
 James M. Maxon (1875–1948), American Episcopal bishop
 Joseph S. Maxon (1838–?), American politician
 Ruth Maxon Adams (1883–1970), American architect
 William Ralph Maxon (1877–1948), American botanist
 Maxon Crumb (born 1945), American artist

Other uses
 Maxon Computer GmbH, a German software company that produces Cinema 4D
 Maxon Effects, a line of effects pedals for guitar and bass
 Maxon excitation, in superfluid helium-4
 maxon Group, a Swiss manufacturer of high-precision drive systems
 Maxon Telecom Co Ltd, a South Korean manufacturer of mobile phones and telecommunication devices
 George John Maxon, a fictional character using the identity of Red Skull

See also 

 Maxson (disambiguation)